The following is a list of songs by the British alternative rock band Wolf Alice. They released a self-titled EP in 2012, followed by the "Leaving You" single. They released "Fluffy" in February 2013, then "Bros" in May. In October 2013, they released the Blush EP. In May 2014 they released the Creature Songs EP. Their debut album My Love Is Cool was released on 22 June 2015.

Songs

References

wolf Alice